The 1949 Minnesota Golden Gophers football team represented the University of Minnesota in the 1949 Big Nine Conference football season. In their 15th year under head coach Bernie Bierman, the Golden Gophers compiled a 7–2 record and outscored their opponents by a combined total of 231 to 80. 
 
Tackle Leo Nomellini was named an All-American by Walter Camp Football Foundation, Associated Press (AP), Look Magazine, and the American Football Coaches Association (AFCA). Center Clayton Tonnemaker was named an All-American by Walter Camp Football Foundation, AP, Collier's/Grantland Rice, Look Magazine, Football Writers Association of America and the AFCA. Nomellini, Tonnemaker and end Bud Grant were named All-Big Ten first team. Guard John Lundin was named All-Big Ten second team.

Bud Grant, end, and John Lundin, guard, were awarded the Team MVP Awards.

Total attendance for the season was 305,200, which averaged to 61,040. The season high for attendance was against Wisconsin.

Schedule

Roster
Dick Anonsen, QB

Jim Malosky, QB

Billy Bye, LHB

Dick Gregory, LHB

George Hudak, LHB

Ralph McAlister, RHB

Dale Warner, RHB

Dick Moy, RHB

Frank Kuzma, FB

Ken Beiersdorf, FB

Bud Grant, E

Gordy Soltau, E

Clayton Tonnemaker, C

Jerry Ekberg, T

Leo Nomellini, T/G

Gene Fritz, G

Johnny Lundin, G

Cal Stoll, E

Russell James Reed, G

References

Minnesota
Minnesota Golden Gophers football seasons
Minnesota Golden Gophers football